For the Love of Cars is a one-hour automotive show first broadcast in 2014 on Channel 4 in the United Kingdom. It is meant to show the character of quintessentially British and European cars through both the engineering and the social side of the car.

The show is presented by actor and car enthusiast Philip Glenister with designer and restoration expert Ant Anstead.

Format
Each show begins with a quick discussion of the car that is to be featured in that episode. Some of the history, and why it is important to British motoring is covered. This is followed by Anstead attempting to locate one of these cars, typically through a barn find, to restore.

As the car is restored by Ant and his team at his car restoration company in Hertfordshire (Evanta Motor Co, although this is never mentioned in the show), Phil looks into the social side of the vehicles, meeting owners' clubs and attending events to get a feel for how the restoration should progress. Phil takes the lead in guiding Ant as to how he would like the restored project to look, but often has his mind changed through discussions with enthusiasts at events.

After the car is restored, Phil and Ant take it for a test drive before they are joined by several similar cars owned by car club members who give their opinions on the restored work. The car is then put on auction at the prestigious Coys of Kensington.

Starting with episode 2 of Series 2, Phil and Ant pick up on other people's car restoration projects that have gone unfinished due to various reasons such as unemployment, declining health, or the untimely death of the restorer. Once the car is restored and placed on auction, all proceeds go to the previous owner for charitable purposes.

Series 1

Series 2
Unlike the first series, the feature car of each episode was shown being sold at auction at the NEC, Birmingham, at the end of the episode (instead of being sold at the end of the series). Starting from episode 2 onward, Ant is given the car for £0 by the owner to restore the car back to its original state; any money that is made at the auction is given to the owner.

Specials

Broadcast
In Australia, Series 1 first aired in 2014 on ABC. Series 1 also aired on subscription television channel Discovery Turbo, beginning on 17 July 2015. Series 2 premiered on 9Go! on 1 December 2015.

References

External links
 Channel 4 programme page 

2014 British television series debuts
2016 British television series endings
Automotive television series
Auction television series
Channel 4 original programming
Driving in the United Kingdom
English-language television shows
Conservation and restoration of vehicles